Spenserian may refer to
the adjective of Spenser, in particular
Edmund Spenser (1552/3–99), English poet, in particular
Spenserian stanza, used in The Faerie Queen; nine lines with rhyme scheme ABABBCBCC
Spenserian sonnet, with rhyme scheme ABAB BCBC CDCD EE

Similar spelling
 Spencerian (disambiguation)